"Nicotine & Gravy" is a song by Beck, from the 1999 album Midnite Vultures. It was released as a single in Europe in July 2000.

The song was performed regularly by Beck from 2000 up to 2009. After 2009 however, the song has only been performed two times. Once in 2014 and once in 2018.

Beck has said that the song "was actually three or four songs put together. I had a bunch of things written when Mickey and Tony came on board as engineers. We worked on the stuff as a group, a squad, all hands on deck. They heard things that worked together, and so we tried them. The beauty of working that way on computer is, when you don't like it, you just hit 'undo.'"

Track listing
 "Nicotine & Gravy" – 5:15
 "Midnite Vultures" – 7:18
 "Zatyricon" – 5:16
 "Nicotine & Gravy" (video)

References

External links

Beck songs
1999 songs
2000 singles
Songs written by Beck
Geffen Records singles

pl:Nicotine & Gravy